Henri Parent (12 April 1819, Valenciennes - 1895, Paris) was a French architect.

Biography 
His brother Clement was the son in law of Joseph-Antoine Froelicher, Henri Parent restored and transformed several hôtels particuliers in the Faubourg Saint-Germain for high aristocratic families.  He worked particularly on the Hôtel de Boisgelin, 47 rue de Varenne (VIIe arrondissement), transformed for the Dukes of Doudeauville and of Bisaccia : putting up panelling originally in the château de Bercy, and creating a chapel, a winter garden, a dining room, stables for 25 horses, two rooms for 8 carriages, two cellars and a grand staircase ("escalier d'honneur") panelled with polychromatic marble plaques and inspired by the queen's staircase at the Palace of Versailles.  (This building is now the Italian embassy.)

He also created three very luxurious Parisian residences:

Hôtel particulier 158 boulevard Haussmann (VIIIe arrondissement), in the Louis XVI style, for Édouard André (1833–1894) in 1867-1874 (today the Musée Jacquemart-André).
Hôtel particulier 5 avenue Van Dyck (VIIIe arrondissement), in the Eclectic style with ornaments sculpted by Jules Dalou, for the industrialist Émile Menier in 1870-1872 (now a private residence).
Hôtel particulier 8 rue Alfred de Vigny (VIIIe arrondissement), Neo Gothic in style, for Henri Menier in 1880 (today the Conservatoire international de musique).

He designed Émile-Justin Menier's tomb, one of the most remarkable in the cimetière du Père-Lachaise (1887).  He came second (after Charles Garnier) in the competition to design the new Opéra de Paris.

With his brother Clément Parent, he restored the châteaux of Ancy-le-Franc for the Clermont-Tonnerre, Esclimont and Bonnetable families.

Sources 
 This article is a translation of the article Henri Parent on French Wikipedia.

1819 births
1895 deaths
19th-century French architects